Penicillium lacus-sarmientei is an anamorph species of the genus of Penicillium which was isolated from soil of the shores of the Lake Sarmiento in the Chilean Tierra del Fuego.

References

Further reading 
 

lacus-sarmientei
Fungi described in 1986